Vincenzo Fardella (8 May 1926 – 14 April 2020) was an Italian ice hockey player. He competed in the men's tournament at the 1948 Winter Olympics.

References

External links
 

1926 births
2020 deaths
Ice hockey people from Milan
Ice hockey players at the 1948 Winter Olympics
Olympic ice hockey players of Italy
Sportspeople from Brescia